JSC "Aviacon Zitotrans" (OAO Aviakompaniya «Aviakon Tsitotrans») is a private cargo airline based in Yekaterinburg, Russia.

History
It was established and started operations in June 1995 and specializes in air transportation of heavy and outsize, high-value, dangerous goods, aerospace equipment, sea containers, humanitarian, government, military, live cargo on IL-76 TD worldwide. It has more than 170 employees and its main base is Koltsovo International Airport, Yekaterinburg. In 2008, the name of the company was changed to Aviacon Air Cargo.

Fleet

As of July 2012, the Aviacon Zitotrans fleet includes the following:  

5 Ilyushin Il-76TD

References

External links

 Official website 

Airlines of Russia
Companies based in Yekaterinburg
Airlines established in 1995
Cargo airlines of Russia
Russian companies established in 1995